Santiago de Vera was a native of Alcalá de Henares, Spain and the sixth Spanish governor of the Philippines, from May 16, 1584, until May 1590.

Governorship
Governor Gonzalo Ronquillo de Peñalosa and Domingo de Salazar, the first bishop of Manila, had requested the King of Spain to establish the Supreme Court of the Philippines then called the Audiencia, to settle disputes between the Church and State.  In 1584, three judges arrived from Mexico and started the justice court with De Vera serving as the chief justice.

After the sudden death of Governor Peñalosa, Diego Ronquillo, his nephew became the governor ad interim but was later charged for defalcation in the trust of Peñalosa's estate and was sent back to Spain as a prisoner.  As the chief justice of the court, Santiago de Vera succeeded as the governor of the islands on May 16, 1584.

First houses of stone

Following the great fire of Manila on March 19, 1583, which started during the wake of Governor Gonzalo Ronquillo de Peñalosa at the San Agustin Church, Santiago de Vera made an order that all construction in Manila should be of stone.  It was found that stone could be easily cut near the banks of the Pasig in Guadalupe (now Guadalupe Viejo in Makati) and brought to Manila in boats.

Fort of Nuestra Señora de Guia
He also built the first stone fort of Manila called Nuestra Señora de Guia (Our Lady of Guidance) in 1587 located at the present location of San Diego Bastion (Baluarte de San Diego) at the southwestern corner of Intramuros with plans by a Jesuit named Sedeño.  The artillery for this fort was cast by Panday Pira.

De Vera also began to dig the moat which surrounded the city.  He also built a stone breastwork along the Pasig riverfront.  The great wall was not begun till the rule of Gómez Pérez Dasmariñas.

References

Captains General of the Philippines
16th-century Spanish people